Soo Line Depot may refer to the following train stations used by the Soo Line Railroad:

Illinois 
 Grand Central Station (Chicago), major passenger terminal in Chicago where the Soo Line was one of the primary tenants

Minnesota 
 Crosby station (Minnesota), listed on the National Register of Historic Places listings in Crow Wing County
 Moose Lake station, listed on the National Register of Historic Places listings in Carlton County
 Remer station, listed on the National Register of Historic Places listings in Cass County, Minnesota
 Thief River Falls station, listed on the National Register of Historic Places listings in Pennington County

Montana 
 Outlook station (Montana), also known as Soo Line Depot, listed on the National Register of Historic Places listings in Sheridan County

North Dakota 
 Minot station (Soo Line), housing the Old Soo Depot Transportation Museum
 Wilton station (North Dakota), also known as Soo Line Depot

South Dakota 
 Pollock station, listed on the National Register of Historic Places listings in Campbell County

Wisconsin 
 Frederic Depot, listed on the National Register of Historic Places listings in Polk County
 Osceola station (Wisconsin), listed on the National Register of Historic Places listings in Polk County
 Ashland station (Soo Line), listed on the National Register of Historic Places listings in Ashland County, Wisconsin
 New Richmond station (Wisconsin), listed on the National Register of Historic Places listings in St. Croix County
 Soo Line Depot, or Waupaca Railroad Depot, Waupaca, Wisconsin

See also 
 Minneapolis, St. Paul and Sault Ste. Marie Depot (disambiguation)